Laevicaulis alte, or the tropical leatherleaf, is a species of tropical land slug, a terrestrial pulmonate gastropod mollusk in the family Veronicellidae, the leatherleaf slugs.

Description 
Its skin is slightly tuberculated. The central keel is beige in colour.

Parasites
This slug is an intermediate host for Angiostrongylus cantonensis, the rat lungworm, a round worm, the most common cause of eosinophilic meningoencephalitis.

Predators
Laevicaulis alte is eaten by the frog Rana tigrina.

Distribution
The species is probably indigenous to Africa, both western Africa and eastern Africa, particularly Tanzania.

It has been introduced and has become an invasive species in the following areas:
 Southern Asia
 Pratas Island, Taiwan
 United States (Hawaii)
 Islands in the Indian Ocean
 Australia (since 1889)
 Samoa

The species is already established in the USA, and is considered to represent a potentially serious threat as a pest, an invasive species which could negatively affect agriculture, natural ecosystems, human health or commerce. Therefore, it has been suggested that this species be given top national quarantine significance in the USA.

Habitat
Laevicaulis alte lives in dry areas, mostly at lower altitudes.

Life cycle

The slug hatches from eggs. Laevicaulis alte has several adaptations for living in dry conditions: a rounded shape with as small as possible surface area, and a narrow foot to reduce evaporation.

Juvenile specimens search for food nearly always at night, and stay buried in the soil during the day. Larger specimens are active during the day sometimes.

References

External links 

 articles at PubMed
 Distribution in Australia
 Distribution in United States
 In English and in Chinese

Images
 Drawing of ventral part of body, photo (In Japanese)
 Laevicaulis alte at  Samoan Snail Project
 Photo (Japanese)
 Photo (Japanese)
 Photo (Japanese)
 Photo (Japanese)

Genome
 Sequences 18S rRNA
 Vernacular names

Veronicellidae
Gastropods described in 1822